Millheim is an unincorporated community in Austin County, in the U.S. state of Texas. According to the Handbook of Texas, its population was 150 in 2000. It is located within the Greater Houston metropolitan area.

History
Millheim was first settled when a mill was built on Clear Creek, a tributary of Mill Creek, in 1845. The first settlers were German immigrants who moved through the Mill Creek Valley southeast from Cat Spring. It received the name Millheim when the Engelking and Noltke general store held a meeting there in the 1850s. Wilhelm Schneider, an immigrant from the Palatinate region suggested the name Muelheim but was later anglicized to its current spelling, Millheim. A singing society was organized in the community in 1856. A post office was established at Millheim in 1878 and remained in operation until 1915 when mail was routed through Peters. The community had 100 residents, as well as a brewery, a gin, a gristmill, a sawmill, and several stores in 1885. Development of the community came to an end when the Gulf, Colorado and Santa Fe Railway bypassed the town to the east. The community's population grew to 150 in 1915 but shrunk back to 100 in 1936. It continued to go down after World War II, but it had three businesses, a church, and 100 residents in 1948. Its population went back up to 150 in 2000.

Geography

Education
The first school in Millheim was established by E.G. Maetze in the 1850s and conducted classes in the German language. It had a school in 1948. Today, the community is served by the Bellville Independent School District.

References

Unincorporated communities in Austin County, Texas
Unincorporated communities in Texas